Nazario is a masculine given name. It is a Hispanic variant of Nazar, Nazer, Nazaire, Nazari or Nazarius. The name may refer to the following people:

Nazario Belmar (1919–1980), Spanish footballer, producer and lawyer
Nazario Benavídez (1802–1858), Argentine general 
Nazario Carlo Bellandi (1919–2010), Italian music composer, organist, pianist and harpsichordist
Nazario Chávez Aliaga (1891–1978), Peruvian journalist, politician and poet
Nazario Escoto, President of Nicaragua
Nazario Fiakaifonu (born 1988), Vanuatuan judoka
Nazario Herrera Ortega (born 1964), Mexican politician
Nazario Moreno González (1970–2014), Mexican drug lord 
Nazario Nazari (1724–1793), Italian painter
Nazario Norberto Sánchez (born 1956), Mexican politician
Nazario Padrón (born 1945), Spanish swimmer
Nazario Pagano (born 1957), Italian politician
Nazario Sauro (1880–1916), Austrian-born Italian irredentist and sailor
Nazario Toledo (1807–1887), Costa Rican politician

Spanish masculine given names
Italian masculine given names